The Great Mills of Paris (Grands Moulins de Paris) are former industrial flourmills which were built in Paris during World War I; they have now been rebuilt and become part of a university campus situated on “Quai Panhard-et-Levassor”. This campus is part of the Paris Rive Gauche development project, in the area known as “quartier de la Gare”, in the 13th arrondissement of Paris.

History and description 

The whole of the merchant mills was built by architect Georges Wybo between 1917 and 1921.
With the activity relocating in Gennevilliers and in Verneuil-l'Étang (two cities just outside of Paris), the Parisian flourmills closed in 1996. A major part of the subsidiary buildings, among which the silos and warehouses, were then pulled down except for the main structure, which was shaped in the form of a quadrangle and in neo-classical style, as well as the largest storage hall: both of these have remained. One part got damaged by fire in 1997.

The main building was renovated by architect Rudy Ricciotti between 2004 and 2006, as was the old “Grain Hall” ("Halle aux farines"), located close by, to be used as the campus for Paris VII – Denis Diderot University.

This building houses the main administrative services of Paris Diderot, as well as the EALC Department (Eastern Asian Languages and Civilization) and the LHS Department (Arts and Science), along with the central Library of the University.

References

External links 
  Site  de l'Université Paris Diderot contenant des photographies pendant et après réhabilitation
  Reportage photographique avant réhabilitation sur Derelicta
  Reportage photographique avant réhabilitation sur friched.net
  Reportage photographique avant réhabilitation sur urban-resources.net

Buildings and structures in the 13th arrondissement of Paris